The Khyber Pass Railway was one of several railway lines in Pakistan, operated and maintained by Pakistan Railways. The line begins at Peshawar City and ended at Landi Khana.

Passenger train traffic on the route has been suspended due to security issues and the 2006 monsoon rains, which washed several sections away.

History

The Great Game was responsible for the creation of the Khyber Pass Railway. The British were convinced that the Russian Empire was planning to invade the British Raj. The most obvious routes for any invasion was through the Khyber Pass or Bolan Pass, and thus it was suggested that strategic railways be built in both of these passes. In 1879, a reconnaissance survey was conducted with an aim to examine the feasibility of laying railways through the two passes (Sind–Pishin State Railway) to thwart any Russian invasion.

In 1905, the North Western State Railway began construction of the line at the village of Kacha Garhi, located between Peshawar and Jamrud. On 31 August 1907, the Anglo-Russian Entente was signed between the United Kingdom and Russia in St. Petersburg, Russia. The agreement ended the shaky British–Russian relations and solidified boundaries, particularly in Afghanistan. The new alliance and boundary agreement meant that Russia was no longer a threat to the British, and work on the railway stopped.

In 1909, several kilometers of permanent way, and some bridges, were removed from the Khyber Pass Railway to be used on other lines being constructed by the North Western State Railway. In 1920, work restarted on the Khyber Pass Railway, and the proposal to use broad gauge was adopted.

Victor Bailey was the engineer who oversaw the construction of the line. The section from Jamrud to Landi Kotal was opened on 3 November 1925, by the wife of the engineer.

The oil-fired steam engines, which pushed and pulled the carriages from the rear and front, were built in the United Kingdom by Vulcan Foundry and by Kitson & Co. An unusual feature of the train journey was that its route passed across the main runway of Peshawar Airport.) On 3 April 1926, the railway was extended to Landi Khana, just three kilometres from the Torkham border crossing with Afghanistan. In 1932, the Landi Kotal to Landi Khana section of railway was closed at the insistence of Afghan government. Regularly scheduled rail services continued between Peshawar and Landi Kotal until ended 1982 due lack of commercial value.

The 2008 monsoon rains in the Khyber Pass washed away significant sections of the railway, and the track was closed to all rail traffic.

Proposed revival
In 2010, Pakistan Railways began a feasibility study to rebuild the Khyber Pass railway and to possibly extend it further west to Jalalabad, Afghanistan. However, work stalled due to the poor security situation along the Pakistan-Afghanistan border.

In 2016, the Afghan Ministry of Public Works began a survey of the railway line from the Pakistan border to Jalalabad. Nangarhar's governor directed relevant authorities to cooperate in undertaking the survey. Afghanistan has also put forth proposals and requests to further extend the railway to Kabul. The Afghanistan Chamber of Commerce & Industries (ACCI) said that the new railway line would facilitate trade with Pakistan.

Stations
 Peshawar City
 Peshawar Cantonment
 Jamrud
 Bagiarari
 Medanak (1st Reversing Station)
 Chaghi (2nd Reversing Station)
 Shahgai
 Kata Kushta
 Zintara
 Sultan Khel
 Landi Kotal
 Torra Tigga (3rd Reversing Station)
 Landi Khana (4th Reversing Station)

References

Notes

Bibliography

External links
British Library Archives and Manuscripts Catalogue: L/MIL/7/6643; “Collection 145/106 Construction of Khyber railway.”; 1919-1926 (Three maps)
British Library Archives and Manuscripts Catalogue: L/PS/10/951/2: “File 8929/1920 Pt 3 NW Frontier: Afghanistan and Khyber Railway; HMG's Waziristan policy”; 1922–26

Closed railway lines in Pakistan
Railway lines opened in 1925
5 ft 6 in gauge railways in Pakistan
Railways with Zig Zags